The 2008–09 Algerian Championnat National was the 47th season of the Algerian Championnat National since its establishment in 1962. A total of 17 teams contested the league, with MC Alger as the defending champions.

On May 29, 2009, ES Sétif were crowned champions with two games remaining after beating USM El Harrach 2-1.

League table

Season statistics

Top scorers

References

Algerian Ligue Professionnelle 1 seasons
1
Algeria